Syed Ishtiaq Ahmed (16 January 1932 – 12 July 2003) was a Bangladeshi lawyer and constitutionalist. He was a former attorney general of Bangladesh. He served as an adviser of law to the non-party caretaker government in two successive terms.

Background and education
Ahmed and his family were originated from Ghazipur in present-day Uttar Pradesh, India. He had four elder brothers and one younger one. He got his elementary education in Ramanath High English School in Hili, Dakshin Dinajpur where his father, Syed Zafar Ahmed, had a business. He also studied in Calcutta Madrasa in Kolkata, West Bengal.

Ahmed passed the matriculation and intermediate exam from Mymensingh Zilla School in 1948 and Dhaka College in 1950 respectively. He completed his bachelor's and master's in economics at the University of Dhaka in 1953 and 1954 respectively. He obtained his second master's in economics from London School of Economics in 1958.

Career
Ahmed joined The Honourable Society of Lincoln's Inn and became a barrister in 1958. He then taught in a secondary school in London until he returned to Bangladesh in 1960. He worked at the Chamber of Barrister ATM Mustafa at Ramkrishna Mission Road in Dhaka. He started practicing law at the East Pakistan High Court.

Ahmed was appointed additional attorney general in 1972 and attorney general in 1976. He was the permanent representative of Bangladesh to the United Nations in 1978. He was recruited as a member of the International Election Observer Group and monitored national elections of Sri Lanka, Nepal, and the Maldives. He served as an adviser to the Caretaker government of Bangladesh in 1991 and again in 2001. He was twice elected president of the Supreme Court Bar Association, during 1978–79 and 1989–90.

Ahmed taught law at the University of Dhaka as a part-time teacher from 1961 to 1968 and served the university as a senior legal adviser from 1972 to 1991. He established "Syed Ishtiaq Ahmed & Associates (SIA&A)".

Ahmed was the president of the Rotary Club of Dhaka North, life member of the Bangla Academy, the Asiatic Society of Bangladesh, the Bangladesh Itihas Parisad, the board of trustees of Centre for Policy Dialogue.

Personal life
Ahmed married Sufia Ibrahim in June 1955. Sufia is an academic and the first female National Professor of Bangladesh. Together they had one son Syed Refaat Ahmed (born December 1959), a justice, and a daughter, Tasneem Raina Fateh, a physician.

Ahmed had been suffering from diabetes, anaemia and encephalopathy. He died of old-age complications at BIRDEM Hospital in Dhaka on 12 July 2003.

On July 18, 2004, Sufia established a trust fund titled "Barrister Syed Ishtiaq Ahmed Memorial Foundation" at the Asiatic Society of Bangladesh.

References

1932 births
2003 deaths
People from Ghazipur
Mymensingh Zilla School alumni
Dhaka College alumni
University of Dhaka alumni
Academic staff of the University of Dhaka
Alumni of the London School of Economics
Bangladeshi barristers
Attorneys General of Bangladesh